Aval Viswasthayayirunnu is a 1978 Indian Malayalam-language film, directed by Jeassy, starring M. G. Soman, Vincent and Jayabharathi. The film also has Kamal Haasan in a guest appearance.

Plot
James, prefers to travel for work because it helps him cope with a heart break. His love Padmini had married someone else. James is transferred to a new place and he accidentally meets Johnny, his college mate. Johnny insists that James stay in his house where James meets Padmini, who is now the wife of Johnny. James accepts Johny invite to stay at his house but he is not comfortable meeting and interacting with Padmini. He is also unable to leave the house due to Johnny's hospitality and affection.

Johnny's mother learns that Padmini was James's love, but she is doesn't blame Padmini for her past.  Life becomes hell for James as well as Padmini as Johnny doesnt allow James to leave the house. But one day, Johnny learns of Padmini's past life. Keep watching to see if  Johnny is able to accept James and Padmini's past.

Cast
M. G. Soman as James
Vincent as Johnny
Jayabharathi as Padmini
Jose Prakash as Doctor
Bahadoor
Unnimary
Sankaradi
Adoor Bhasi as James' father
Mallika Sukumaran
Sreelatha Namboothiri as Johnny's house maid
T. R. Omana as Johnny's mother
Manavalan Joseph
Kamal Haasan as College student (guest appearance)

Production 
Aval Viswasthayayirunnu film produced by J. J. Kuttikkattu under production banner J. J. Productions. Kamal Haasan plays a three-minute guest role as a college student who unsuccessfully tries to win over his lady love Unnimary. This film was shot in black-and-white. It was given an "U" (Unrestricted) certificate by the Central Board of Film Certification.

Soundtrack

The music was composed by M. K. Arjunan and the lyrics were written by Kanam E. J.

References

External links 
 
 

Films directed by Jeassy
1970 films
1970s Malayalam-language films
Films based on Malayalam novels